Mohammed Ahmed Meman (born 26 June 1952) is a former Zimbabwean cricketer. He played one One Day International for Zimbabwe in the 1987 World Cup.

Meman also represented Shropshire in the Minor Counties Championship from 1977 to 1980, and played one match for Shropshire in the 1978 Gillette Cup, scoring 16 and taking 0/22 from ten overs against Surrey. During those years he appeared in 32 matches for the county, achieving a century in two of them, making 888 runs and taking 55 wickets. At club level he played for Pudsey St Lawrence in Yorkshire and Tonge.

References

External links
 

1952 births
Living people
People from Lundazi District
Zimbabwean people of Indian descent
Shropshire cricketers
Zimbabwe One Day International cricketers
Zimbabwean cricketers
Cricketers at the 1987 Cricket World Cup